Coppice Performing Arts School is an 11–18 mixed secondary school and sixth form with academy status in Wednesfield, Wolverhampton, West Midlands, England.

The school includes a resource base for students with moderate learning difficulties. Facilities include playing fields, a Drama theatre and Dance studio. The school also offers extended school programmes within the local community.

History 
Coppice was designated as a Performing Arts school in September 2003. This has extended the range of opportunities for all students, and enhanced partnerships with local schools and community groups.

The school has the Artsmark Gold award and Investors in People standard. Coppice is also involved in the successful Sport in the Community programme, with a coordinator placed in school 2 days a week.

The most recent OFSTED inspection rated the school as requires improvement (Jan 2014) grade 3.

The school's sixth form works in collaboration with Wednesfield High School, a number of subjects being shared across the two schools.

References

External links 
 

Secondary schools in Wolverhampton
Academies in Wolverhampton